Saber shin is a malformation of the tibia. It presents as a sharp anterior bowing, or convexity, of the tibia.


Causes
Periosteal reaction along the shaft of the tibia.
It can result from congenital syphilis, yaws, Paget's disease of bone, vitamin D deficiency or Weismann-Netter–Stuhl syndrome. It can be due to osteomalacia.

Prognosis
The bone looks like a boomerang from an early age.

Etymology 
Saber refers to the tibia's resemblance to the curve of a saber sword.

See also 
 Saddle nose
 List of cutaneous conditions
 Rickets

References

Bibliography 
 Mosby's Medical, Nursing, & Allied Health Dictionary.  Edition 5, 1998 p7B49.

Musculoskeletal disorders
Bacterium-related cutaneous conditions
Syphilis